
Gmina Baranowo is a rural gmina (administrative district) in Ostrołęka County, Masovian Voivodeship, in east-central Poland.

Villages
Gmina Baranowo contains the villages and settlements of Adamczycha, Bakuła, Baranowo, Błędowo, Brodowe Łąki, Budne Sowięta, Cierpięta, Czarnotrzew, Dąbrowa, Dłutówka, Gaczyska, Guzowatka, Jastrząbka, Kopaczyska, Kucieje, Lipowy Las, Majdan, Majki, Nowe Czerwińskie, Oborczyska, Orzeł, Ramiona, Rupin, Rycica, Witowy Most, Wola Błędowska, Zawady and Ziomek.

Neighbouring gminas
Gmina Baranowo is bordered by the gminas of Chorzele, Czarnia, Jednorożec, Kadzidło, Krasnosielc, Lelis, Myszyniec and Olszewo-Borki.

References

External links
Polish official population figures 2006

Baranowo
Ostrołęka County